The Somalia national football team (Arabic: الاتحاد الصومالي لكرة القدم), nicknamed the Ocean Stars, represents Somalia in international football and is controlled by the Somali Football Federation (SFF), a member of the Confederation of African Football (CAF). Somalia's first national team captain was Mr. Mohamed Shangole, whilst its longest serving captain has been Hasan Babay.

History
The first Somali football teams were established in the 1940s. The competitions were basic in structure and were associated with the anti-colonial movement. The Somali Youth League (SYL), the nation's first political party, had put together a team of local youth to play against the Italian expatriate teams. The soccer team the FYL had assembled, which would later change its name to Bondhere, won the first several competitions. In 1951, the Somali Football Federation (SFF) was founded. The first Somali commissioner for sport was later established in 1958.

Although the Somali national football team took part in preliminary matches, it has never qualified for the World Cup. For many years after the outbreak of the civil war in the early 1990s, FIFA-sanctioned games could not be played within the country. Qualifying matches for the Africa Cup of Nations and the World Cup were instead contested away from home. However, following the pacification of the capital Mogadishu in 2011, the SFF began preparations for the first major sporting event to be held in years at the Mogadishu Stadium, in December 2012.

Prior to 2019, the Somali FA decided they would admit to all their young and upcoming youth talents and put out local trials to fortify both Olympic and national football teams.

In addition, many from the Somali diaspora in the past have produced quality football players such as Islam Feruz and Mukhtar Ali.

On 5 September 2019, Somalia won their first qualifying match since 1984 (against Kenya - AFCON Qualifying) and their first-ever FIFA World Cup qualifying match, beating Zimbabwe by 1–0. They nearly advanced to the second round but lost 3–1 in Zimbabwe after two late goals for the warriors, consigning the Ocean Stars to an early exit.

Team image

Kits and crest 

From the 1970s up until the 1990s, the Somali national football team used to wear solid sky blue shirts and socks with white shorts for home kits and the inverse as away kits, the two primary colours of the Somali national flags, in the 2010s up until the present, the national team have now replaced the solid sky blue shirts for vertically blue and white striped shirts.

The crest of the Somali national team used to be the coat of arms of Somalia but it is now replaced with the Somali Federation crest. The Ocean Stars plays their home games in the Mogadishu Stadium, (As the stadium was being rebuilt, the national team played matches at Engineer Yaarisow Stadium, which is Mogadishu's secondary stadium for sporting events).

Recent schedule and results

The following is a list of match results from the previous 12 months, as well as any future matches that have been scheduled.

2022

Coaches

Players

Current squad
The following players were selected for the 2023 Africa Cup of Nations qualification match against Eswatini on 23 and 27 March 2022 respectively.

Caps and goals correct as of 27 March 2022, after the match against Eswatini.

Recent call ups

Player records

Players in bold are still active with Somalia.

Most capped players

Top goalscorers

Competitive record

FIFA World Cup

Africa Cup of Nations

African Nations Championship

Olympic Games

All-Africa Games

CECAFA Cup

FIFA Arab Cup

Pan Arab Games

Minor tournaments

See also
Somali national beach soccer team
Somali League
Somali Cup
Somali Football Federation

Notes

References

External links

Somali Football Federation
FIFA – Somalia
List of international matches at RSSSF

 
African national association football teams
Football in Somalia